Adlene Harrison (November 19, 1923 – February 19, 2022) was an American politician who served on the Dallas City Council from 1973 to 1977, and was acting mayor of Dallas in 1976. She also served as regional administrator for the Environmental Protection Agency from 1977 to 1981 and as the first chair of the Dallas Area Rapid Transit Board. She was the first Jewish woman to serve as Mayor of a major U.S. city. She was Dallas' first Jewish mayor and first female mayor; Annette Strauss would follow her in both categories. Harrison, a Democratic city councilwoman, succeeded Wes Wise as mayor when he resigned to run for the United States Congress. She served until the election of a new mayor, Robert Folsom, at the end of the year.

Harrison died on February 19, 2022, at the age of 98.

References

1923 births
2022 deaths
21st-century American Jews
21st-century American women
Women city councillors in Texas
Women mayors of places in Texas
Jewish mayors of places in the United States
Jewish women politicians
Mayors of Dallas
Dallas City Council members
Texas Democrats
Jewish American people in Texas politics